Federico Grabich (born 26 March 1990) is an Argentine competitive swimmer.

In August 2015, Grabich won the bronze medal at the World Championships, being the first medal for his country in a World Championship and the silver medal at the 2015 World Cup in Qatar.

At the 2012 Summer Olympics he finished 41st overall in the heats in the Men's 100 metre backstroke and failed to reach the semifinals. He finished in 35th place in the men's 50 metre freestyle. He competed at the 2016 Summer Olympics, in the 50, 100 and 200 m freestyle.

Grabish won the bronze medal at the 2011 Pan American Games and the gold and silver medal at the 2015 Pan American Games. At the 2015 Pan American Games, Grabich won the 100m Freestyle, setting a new Argentine record. He also won a silver medal in 200m, setting another Argentine record.  At the South American Games he won ten medals (two of them were gold). At the 2015 Pan American Games, Grabich won the 100m Freestyle, setting a new Argentine record. He also won a silver medal in 200m, setting another Argentine record.

References

External links 
 
 
 

1990 births
Living people
Argentine male swimmers
Argentine people of Croatian descent
Argentine people of Czech descent
Pan American Games gold medalists for Argentina
Pan American Games silver medalists for Argentina
Pan American Games bronze medalists for Argentina
People from Casilda
Olympic swimmers of Argentina
Swimmers at the 2012 Summer Olympics
Swimmers at the 2016 Summer Olympics
Male backstroke swimmers
Swimmers at the 2011 Pan American Games
Swimmers at the 2015 Pan American Games
Swimmers at the 2019 Pan American Games
World Aquatics Championships medalists in swimming
Pan American Games medalists in swimming
South American Games gold medalists for Argentina
South American Games silver medalists for Argentina
South American Games bronze medalists for Argentina
South American Games medalists in swimming
Competitors at the 2010 South American Games
Competitors at the 2014 South American Games
Medalists at the 2011 Pan American Games
Medalists at the 2015 Pan American Games
Medalists at the 2019 Pan American Games
Sportspeople from Santa Fe Province
20th-century Argentine people
21st-century Argentine people